Talovy is a rural locality (a khutor) in Sukhodolskoye Rural Settlement, Sredneakhtubinsky District, Volgograd Oblast, Russia. The population was 26 as of 2010. There is 1 street.

Geography 
Talovy is located 17 km southeast of Srednyaya Akhtuba (the district's administrative centre) by road. Sukhodol is the nearest rural locality.

References 

Rural localities in Sredneakhtubinsky District